The Shadow of Lightning Ridge is a 1920 Australian silent film starring renowned Australian sportsman Snowy Baker. It has been called the most "Western"-like of the films Baker made in Australia.

It is now considered a lost film.

Charles Chauvel had a small role as a groom.

The success of the film prompted the formation of the Carroll-Baker Film Corporation with capital of £25,000. A studio, Palmerston, at Waverly was established.

Synopsis
Travelling in a carriage is Sir Edward Marriott, a wealthy mine owner, his fiancée Dorothy Hardyn, and a bag containing the month's pay for the miners. They are travelling to Marriott's estate at Lightning Ridge. There is also a man with a hacking cough.

A conveyance with armed escort meets the train to prevent the large sum of money from a mysterious outlaw known as The Shadow. However The Shadow, the man with the hacking cough, gets the money and a necklace from the Dorothy. He jumps on to a horse and escapes.

It turns out the Shadow is actually a gentleman in disguise with a vendetta against Sir Edward because his mother has been victimised by him. He has become a The Shadow but only attacks Sir Edward's property.

The Shadow rescues Dorothy from real bushrangers and they fall in love. Later he discovers he is the real heir to Sir Edward's property. Portuguese Anne, who is in love with the Shadow, becomes jealous of Dorothy and arranges for the Shadow to be arrested. However he escapes.

Cast
 Snowy Baker as the Shadow
 Agnes Vernon as Dorothy Harden
 Bernice Vere as Portuguese Annie
 Wilfred Lucas as Sir Edward Marriott
 Evelyn Johnson
 Reg K Bisley as station guard

Production
The script was clearly inspired by Zorro, which Bess Meredyth later adapted in The Mark of Zorro (1940). After reading the script and seeing the stunts he was required to perform, Baker reportedly went out and insured himself for £5,000.

Bernice Vere was a discovery of Baker's. She was signed to a 12-month contract.

Shooting took place in early 1920 in the bush near Sydney, at Bulli Pass and Loddon Falls and at a studio built by E.J. Carroll at Palmerston near Waverly.

A highlight of the film was Snowy Baker on horseback jumping 40 metres off a cliff.

Baker used a stuntman for some of the more dangerous scenes.

Reception

Critical
The trade paper Everyone's said:
Baker as an elusive bushranger brings joy to  the  hearts  of  the  Pussyfoots by entirely wrecking  a  bush pub.  Snowy  doesn’t  do  it  on  behalf  of prohibition.  He’s  escaping  from  the Law and the big  fight  that  ensues  causes the  damage.  It  was  thought  at  first that  the  big  scene  could  be  done  with empty  bottles  on  the  shelves,  but  so many  were  smashed  that  it  was  found that  there  was  a  sad  lack  of  realism. So,  to  the  horror  of  many  actors,  dozens of  bottles  of  real  whisky  were  deliberately  wasted.  Now,  it  is  said,  "  The Shadow  of  Lightning  Ridge"  is  certain of  a  tremendous  success  especially  after 6  p.m.  Thirsty  folk  will  go  along  just to  smell  the  bush  pubs  scene.

The Bulletin praised the photography but thought the story was too American saying the "only Australian   thing   about" the movie "is   the   setting.  The   scenery   is   dinkum,   but   the   story   itself   is  a   mixture   of   old   melodrama   and   Wild   West  movie.   Australia   wants   Australian   films,   and  
in   spite   of   "Snowy"   Baker's   great   athletic  business,   she   will   refuse   to   swallow   "The  Shadow"   as   the   thing   her   soul   cries   for.  
Leading-woman   Brownie   Vernon,   also   being  American,   adds   nothing   Australian   to   the  picture. But   the   photography   is   excellent." Heaven   forbid   that   this   sort   of   stuff   should  go   out   to   the   world   as   dinkum   Australian   !" 

The Lone Hand said it was the "Best   Australian   production   to   date.   Station life   and   bush   scenes   well   depicted,   but   story  not   original."
  
Australian Worker said the film was "considerably better" than Man from Kangaroo.

Meredyth and Lucas left for Sonoma on 11 February 1920 so were not in Australia when the film premiered.

Box Office
The film was a success at the Australian box office. Reportedly "thousands" witnessed it in its Melbourne season and broke box office records in Newcastle.

Dan Carroll later said his company "was encouraged to consider making further pictures" after the success of this and Man from Kangaroo. He "found, however, that small producers had entered the field, and, releasing pictures of a low duality, had made Australian films subjects for the ridicule of audiences. Lack of Australian stories suitable for dramatisation and the fact that oversea producers were releasing films more than sufficient for market needs had also forced him and his associates to abandon the production of films."

The film was screened in Australian cinemas as late as 1923.

US release
The film was released in the US in 1922 by William Selig. One trade paper wrote that:
"Good stunt stuff is introduced in the film, and there are a few genuine thrills such as the leap from a dashing horse on to a speeding train; a kidnapping episode and a daring rescue. In connection with some of the stunts performed by Baker it would seem that either the director has been too hasty in an effort to get action or the film has not been carefully cut. At any rate, things happen along just a little too quickly to follow comprehensively. This is particularly noticeable in the instance where Baker rescues the girl he loves."

See also
 List of lost films

References

External links
 
 [http://colsearch.nfsa.gov.au/nfsa/search/display/display.w3p;adv=no;group=;groupequals=;holdingType=;page=0;parentid=;query=the%20shadow%20of%20lightning%20ridge;querytype=;rec=6;resCount=10 The Shadow of Lightning Ridge] at National Film and Sound Archive
 The Shadow of Lightning Ridge at SilentEra

1921 films
1921 Western (genre) films
1921 lost films
1921 drama films
Australian black-and-white films
Australian drama films
Bushranger films
Films directed by Wilfred Lucas
Films with screenplays by Bess Meredyth
Lost Australian films
Lost Western (genre) films
Silent Australian Western (genre) films
Silent drama films
1920s English-language films